The Museum of Contemporary Art in Antwerp (commonly abbreviated as M HKA, previously MuHKA) is the contemporary art museum of the city of Antwerp, Belgium. Its current director is Bart de Baere.

Overview

The museum holds a permanent collection of contemporary art from Belgian and international artists, an arthouse cinema and an extensive library of books on contemporary art.

History
Museum of Contemporary Art was founded in 1982 by the Flemish Community. M HKA's first director was  until 1992. In 2002, Bart de Baere took position.   The architect responsible for the creation of the museum from an old grain storage space (1987) was Michel Grandsard who also designed the extension of the museum (1997). Current exhibition curators are Nav Haq, Liliane Dewachter, Anne-Claire Schmitz and Joanna Zielińska. From 2003 until 2011 Dieter Roelstraete was a curator at the Antwerp Museum of Contemporary Art (MuHKA).

Solo exhibitions (selection)
 2019: Soleil Politique Marcel Broodthaers
 2019: The Perfect Kiss James Lee Byars
 2019: AM-BIG-YOU-US LEGSICON Laure Prouvost
 2018: Names Jef Geys
 2017: Greetings from the Eurasian Joseph Beuys
 2017: Romulus Peter Wächtler
 2016:  The Secret of Permanent Creation Robert Filliou
 2015:  Bruises and Lustre Otobong Nkanga
 2015:  The Shape of the words Fabrice Hyber
 2013:  Jos de Gruyter & Harald Thys Optimundus
 2012:   A Matter of Life and Death and Singing Jimmie Durham

References

External links

Art museums and galleries in Belgium
Modern art museums
Belgian art
Museums in Antwerp